Carmen Trotta is a pacifist and a member of  the Catholic Worker Movement, Trotta has been an opponent of the war in Iraq. He has been an associate editor of the Catholic Worker, and has served on the executive committee of the War Resisters League.

Education 
Trotta graduated from Grinnell College in 1984.

Pacifist and Human Rights Actions 
Trotta helped organize the April 20, 2002 march on Washington to oppose the War on Terror.

On May 30, 2008, he was sentenced to ten days in jail for protesting abuses at Guantanamo in front of the U.S Supreme Court.

He was a founding member of Witness Against Torture,  and as a member of that group, he was the first person arrested in the "100 Days Campaign" protest at the White House, against the prison at Guantanamo Bay Detention Camp

Kings Bay Plowshares
On April 4, 2018, he took part in the Kings Bay Plowshares action.

Bibliography

References

American Christian pacifists
Catholic Workers
American anti–Iraq War activists
Grinnell College alumni
1963 births
Living people
American human rights activists
War Resisters League activists
Catholic pacifists